Kolehu or Koleh Hu or Kalah Hu or Kolah Hu may refer to:

Kolah Hu, Kermanshah
Kolehu, Lorestan